Anzu may refer to:

Anzû, a divine storm-bird in several Mesopotamian religions
Anzu (dinosaur), a genus of theropod dinosaur containing the species Anzu wyliei

As a given name

 is a Japanese given name for females. Kyoko is an alternate reading of the same kanji (杏子).

People
, Japanese voice actress
, American actress
, Japanese actress
, Japanese judoka

Fictional characters
, a character in Hinamatsuri_(manga)
, a character in Girls und Panzer
, a protagonist in Yu-Gi-Oh!
, a character in Da Capo II
, a character in Gantz
Iyojima Anzu, a main character of Nogi Wakaba is a Hero.
Anzu Kinashi, a character from the Japanese horror adventure game, Kimi ga Shine -Tasūketsu Death Game-

Japanese feminine given names